is a registered museum in Tsu, Mie Prefecture, Japan. The collection includes tea utensils, paintings, books, historical materials relating to the merchants of Ise Province, and items relating to potter and founder  (1878–1963).

See also

 Mie Prefectural Museum
 Ise Jingū

References

External links
  Sekisui Museum

Tsu, Mie
Museums in Mie Prefecture
Museums established in 1930
1930 establishments in Japan